Perryville is an unincorporated community in Perry County, Alabama, United States.

History
Perryville is most likely named after Perry County, which in turn is named for Commodore Oliver Hazard Perry. A post office operated under the name Perryville from 1839 to 1954. In 1846, the Perryville schoolhouse was built on land sold by Exum Melton.

References

Unincorporated communities in Perry County, Alabama
Unincorporated communities in Alabama